
Lipno County is a unit of territorial administration and local government (powiat) in Kuyavian-Pomeranian Voivodeship, north-central Poland. It was formed on January 1, 1999, as a result of the Polish local government reforms passed in 1998.

As of 2019 its total population is 65,869, out of which the population of Lipno is 14,339, that of Skępe is 3,620, that of Dobrzyń nad Wisłą is 2,129, and the rural population is 45,723.

Neighbouring counties
Lipno County is bordered by Golub-Dobrzyń County to the north, Rypin County to the north-east, Sierpc County to the east, Płock County to the south-east, the city of Włocławek and Włocławek County to the south, and Aleksandrów County and Toruń County to the west.

Administrative division
The county is subdivided into nine gminas (one urban, two urban-rural and six rural). These are listed in the following table, in descending order of population.

References
   Polish official population figures 2019

 
Lipno